Slick & Rose is an Atlanta-based pop, new wave and R&B duo that formed in 2000.  The duo is composed of Nikki "Slick" Ervin, from Mobile, Alabama, and Sabrina "Rose" Harvey, from New York City

History
They have opened for and/or performed with musicians including Common, Kindred The Family Soul, Phife Dawg, Angie Stone, Sugarland, Vivian Green, Scratch, Donnie, Joi, Slum Village, Nappy Roots, Edwin McCain, Van Hunt, Chingy, DJ Drama, Janelle Monáe, Dead Prez, John Legend and Kanye West.

Awards 
Teen Diaries Online Featured Artist
MAYBELLINE/JANE Magazine 2007 Reader-Produced CD Winners
Billboard Magazine's Breakout Act of 2005
Creative Loafing Magazine's Best Atlanta R&B/Soul Act
Black Girls Rock! Award, presented by Atlanta's premier tastemakers
MySpace Music Artist of the Week

Tour appearances 
Okayplayer/Black Lilly Tour, Japan
Common – One Day It Will All Make Sense Tour, USA

Discography 
2003: Objects in the Mirror
2007: Winter Spells, Vol. 1 Mixtape
TBD: Ambitious Intellectuals

Compilations/guest appearances 
"Move Your Body" and "Ain't Nothing Gonna Stop Us" - MoBonics
"Welcome to Atlantis" - Wordslife: A Thin Line between Poetry and Hip-hop - Aqiyl
"Dance, Groove" - 2003 - Vintage Vegetarians - Proton
DJ Drama Automatic Relaxation Mix CD 4 - 7
"What'cha know about the LRG?" - LRG Magic Show Compilation
"Can You Stand the Reign?" - The Reign Begins
"Milk and Honey" feat. D.R.E.S tha Beatnik - Have Mic…Will Travel: The Live Experience
"Love According to Dexter" - Dexter's Laboratory - Phife (A Tribe Called Quest)
"You Know You Want It" - Phife (A Tribe Called Quest)
Hennessey Compilation
Fader Magazine's Suite 903 Compilation mixed by DJ Drama
MySpace Hip-Hop Compilation, Vol. 1
MAYBELLINE/JANE Magazine Reader-Produced CD
"California Dreaming" and "Pole Position" - The Humdinger - Nappy Roots
Information Age - dead prez - date TBD

Films
Slick & Rose's music has been featured in the award-winning films Premium and Yellow.

Notes

External links 
Slick & Rose On MySpace

Musical groups from Georgia (U.S. state)